Protoelongata is a genus of sea snails, marine gastropod molluscs, in the family Costellariidae, the ribbed miters.

Species
Species within the genus Protoelongata include:
 Protoelongata bilineata (Reeve, 1845)
 Protoelongata corallina (Reeve, 1845)
 Protoelongata dekkersi (Herrmann, Stossier & Salisbury, 2014)
 Protoelongata heleneae (Herrmann, Stossier & Salisbury, 2014)
 Protoelongata loyaltyensis (Hervier, 1897)
 Protoelongata rubrotaeniata (Herrmann, Stossier & Salisbury, 2014)
 Protoelongata xerampelina (Melvill, 1895)

References

Costellariidae
Gastropod genera